Jean-Pierre Vigier (born 22 October 1969) is a French politician who has represented the 2nd constituency of the Haute-Loire department in the National Assembly since 2012. A member of The Republicans (LR), he has also held a seat in the Regional Council of Auvergne-Rhône-Alpes since 2016.

He served as Mayor of Lavoûte-Chilhac from 2008 to 2020, an office to which he succeeded his father. Since 2020, he has been a municipal councillor of Lavoûte-Chilhac.

See also 
 2015 French regional elections

References

External links 
 Facebook
 Twitter

Living people
1969 births
Deputies of the 14th National Assembly of the French Fifth Republic
Deputies of the 15th National Assembly of the French Fifth Republic
Deputies of the 16th National Assembly of the French Fifth Republic
Union for a Popular Movement politicians
The Republicans (France) politicians
People from Haute-Loire
Regional councillors of Auvergne-Rhône-Alpes
Mayors of places in Auvergne-Rhône-Alpes